Ulrike Schmidt (born 30 March 1969) is a German former beach volleyball player. She competed in the women's tournament at the 2000 Summer Olympics.

References

External links
 

1969 births
Living people
German women's beach volleyball players
Olympic beach volleyball players of Germany
Beach volleyball players at the 2000 Summer Olympics
People from Remscheid
Sportspeople from Düsseldorf (region)